Haukur Arnórsson (born 17 April 1971) is an Icelandic alpine skier. He competed at the 1994 Winter Olympics and the 1998 Winter Olympics.

References

External links
 

1971 births
Living people
Haukur Arnórsson
Haukur Arnórsson
Alpine skiers at the 1994 Winter Olympics
Alpine skiers at the 1998 Winter Olympics
Haukur Arnórsson
20th-century Icelandic people